Bow Bowing is a suburb of Sydney, in the state of New South Wales, Australia. Bow Bowing is located 55 kilometres south-west of the Sydney central business district, in the local government area of the City of Campbelltown and is part of the Macarthur region.

History
The suburb Bow Bowing draws its name from a local creek. The creek's name is probably of aboriginal origin since it was originally spelt Boro Borang and later corrupted. The name Bow Bowing was only chosen for the suburb in 1975 and for more than one hundred years prior to that it was known as Saggart's Field after a local family. A school built in 1866 was named Saggart Field School although it was renamed Minto Public School in 1884.

The land in the area was purchased by the Housing Commission in 1976 with the intention of building over one thousand homes in the relatively small area of the new suburb. Local concerns, particularly over other Housing Commission developments in the area, forced the original plan to be shelved. The land was subsequently sold to private developers who built 350 homes in the area. The development was officially opened in 1990.

Population
According to the 2016 census, there were 1,602 people in Bow Bowing. 61.6% of people were born in Australia. 61.4% of people spoke only English at home. Other languages spoken at home included Hindi at 6.4%. The most common responses for religion in Bow Bowing were Catholic 31.4%, No Religion 13.9%, Anglican 13.3%, Islam 8.3% and Hinduism 7.6%.

References

Suburbs of Sydney
Towns in the Macarthur (New South Wales)
City of Campbelltown (New South Wales)